Eastern Guangdong intercity railway is a system of commuter rail lines under construction in Guangdong, China. Construction started on December 17, 2021.

Stations
Eastern Guangdong intercity railway is divided into 5 sections. The stations in each section:

 Shantou to Jieyang Airport

Liantang

 Chaozhou East to Jieyang Airport

Fuyang

 (reserved station)

 Jieyang Airport to Jieyang South

 Jieyang South to Jieyang

 Chaozhou East to Shantou 

 (reserved station)

References

Railway lines in China
Rail transport in Guangdong